Our Love is Here to Stay is a 1997 studio album by jazz guitarist and singer John Pizzarelli. Pizzarelli is joined by his regular trio members consisting of brother Martin Pizzarelli on double-bass and Ray Kennedy, as well as trombonist Don Sebesky and his big band.

The title track received a 1998 Grammy nomination for best arrangement.

Track listing 
Dream
Our Love Is Here to Stay
Avalon
Honey Pie
The Day I Found You ('The Pollywog Song')
Kalamazoo (I've Got A Gal In)
Have Another One, Not Me
Little Girl
Nina Never Knew
Rhythm Is Our Business
It's Sunday
Say Hey Kid

Personnel
John Pizzarellivocals, guitar
Martin Pizzarellidouble-bass
Ray Kennedypiano
The Don Sebesky New York All Star Band

References

1997 albums
John Pizzarelli albums
Big band albums
RCA Records albums